David Malo Azagra (born 21 August 1980 in Marcilla, Navarre) is a Spanish retired professional footballer who played as a right back.

External links

1980 births
Living people
People from Tafalla (comarca)
Spanish footballers
Footballers from Navarre
Association football defenders
Segunda División players
Segunda División B players
Tercera División players
Peña Sport FC footballers
SD Eibar footballers
Real Unión footballers
UE Sant Andreu footballers
Alicante CF footballers
SD Ponferradina players
Palamós CF footballers